The Sheriff of Medicine Bow is a 1948 American Western film directed by Lambert Hillyer and written by J. Benton Cheney. The film stars Johnny Mack Brown, Raymond Hatton, Max Terhune, Evelyn Finley, Bill Kennedy and George J. Lewis. The film was released on October 3, 1948, by Monogram Pictures.

Plot

Cast          
Johnny Mack Brown as Johnny Mack Brown
Raymond Hatton as Banty Prentiss
Max Terhune as Alibi
Evelyn Finley as Nan Prentiss
Bill Kennedy as Barry Stuart
George J. Lewis as Buckeye
Frank LaRue as Jim Carson 
Peter Perkins as Pardo 
Carol Henry as Grogan 
Bob Woodward as Duke

References

External links
 

1948 films
American Western (genre) films
1948 Western (genre) films
Monogram Pictures films
Films directed by Lambert Hillyer
American black-and-white films
1940s English-language films
1940s American films